This is a list of films featuring the French Foreign Legion in which the French Foreign Legion is portrayed either through its plot or by a main character.

The French Foreign Legion is a military arm of the French army, established in 1831, and it has seen action throughout the world, recently in Africa and the Middle East.  It has been featured in a large number of films, including a number about the legion itself, such as 1949's Outpost in Morocco.

List of films

Further reading
Guinle, Pierre and Giuseppe Ricci. Filmografia Della Legione Straniera. 
Rimini: Cineteca del Comune di Rimini, 1992 78p. Series Title: Riminicinema: Quaderni della cineteca; 9. 
Leibfried, Philip The Films of the French Foreign Legion Bear Manor Media (November 10, 2011)

Lists of films by topic
French Foreign Legion
Lists of French films